is a passenger railway station located in the town of Ishii, Myōzai District,  Tokushima Prefecture, Japan. It is operated by JR Shikoku and has the station number "B05".

Lines
Besides local service trains, the Tsurugisan limited express service also stops at Kuramoto.

Layout
The station consists of two opposed side platforms serving 2 tracks. Track 2 is the through-track while track 1 is a passing loop. A siding branches off track 1. A station building houses a waiting room and a JR ticket window (without a Midori no Madoguchi facility). Access to the opposite platform is by means of a footbridge.

Adjacent stations

History
When the company was nationalized on 1 September 1907, Japanese Government Railways (JGR) took over control of the station and operated it as part of the Tokushima Line (later the Tokushima Main Line). With the privatization of Japanese National Railways (JNR), the successor of JGR, on 1 April 1987, the station came under the control of JR Shikoku. On 1 June 1988, the line was renamed the Tokushima Line.

Surrounding area
Ishii Town Hall
 Ishiicho Central Community Center
Tokushima Prefectural Myozai High School
Ishii Municipal Ishii Junior High School

See also
 List of Railway Stations in Japan

References

External links

 JR Shikoku timetable

Railway stations in Japan opened in 1899
Railway stations in Tokushima Prefecture
Ishii, Tokushima